Paul Costelloe (born 23 June 1945) is an Irish designer and artist.

In popular culture
In 2010, Costelloe was one of six contemporary and internationally renowned Irish fashion designers featured on a set of Irish postage stamps issued by An Post. The other designers featured were Louise Kennedy, Lainey Keogh, John Rocha, Philip Treacy and Orla Kiely.
Along with Kennedy, he was a celebrity guest judge for the 2013 final of RTÉ Television's Craft Master show.

See also
List of people on the postage stamps of Ireland

References

External links 

Official Menswear Shop
London Fashion Week profile

1945 births
Irish fashion designers
Living people
People educated at Blackrock College